Brad Redekopp  (born 1964/1965) is a Canadian politician who was elected to represent the riding of Saskatoon West in the House of Commons of Canada in the 2019 Canadian federal election.

Biography

Redekopp was born in Yorkton, Saskatchewan. He has lived in the Saskatoon, Saskatchewan, area since 1984 and received a bachelor's degree in commerce from the University of Saskatchewan. Redekopp worked in finance and accounting roles for twenty years in the manufacturing industry  and worked as a plant manager for Case New Holland in Saskatoon. Prior to his election, he owned and operated a home building company, Cherry Creek Homes, for ten years. Redekopp is married to his wife, Cheryl, and has two sons, Kyle and Eric.

Electoral record

References

External links

Living people
Conservative Party of Canada MPs
Members of the House of Commons of Canada from Saskatchewan
People from Yorkton
Politicians from Saskatoon
Year of birth uncertain
Year of birth missing (living people)